Golden Hall is a 3,200-seat indoor arena in San Diego, California, built in 1964. Golden Hall is located within the San Diego Concourse complex at 1 Civic Center Plz
San Diego, CA 92101 and is primarily utilized as a banquet hall today.

History

Music
Built in 1964, Golden Hall has been the host of many concerts, events and athletics. Legendary musical artists Bob Dylan, The Rolling Stones, Grateful Dead, Boston, Pink Floyd and B.B. King have all played at the venue.

San Diego Conquistadors
In the 1973–74 basketball season, Golden Hall was home to the San Diego Conquistadors of the American Basketball Association. The Conquistadors, nicknamed the "Qs" were coached by NBA Hall of Fame player Wilt Chamberlain during the 1973–74 season. The team had a record of 37–47, finishing 4th in the ABA Western Division and losing to the Utah Stars in the playoffs.

The Qs started as an ABA expansion franchise in 1972–73 and played at Peterson Gym on the campus of San Diego State University during their initial season. Owner Leonard Bloom had hoped to move his new team into the 14,000 seat San Diego Sports Arena, but Bloom had a feud with Arena proprietor Peter Graham, as Graham had attempted to secure the ABA franchise himself. This forced the Qs to play at 3,200-seat Golden Hall. After signing 7-foot-1-inch-tall Chamberlain to serve as a player-coach, the team used the advertising slogan "Tallest Coach in the Smallest Arena." Rookie Caldwell Jones, ABA All-Star Red Robbins, ABA All-Star Stew Johnson and former NBA All-Star Flynn Robinson were notable players on the Q's roster that season.

Bloom lured Chamberlain from the National Basketball Association's Los Angeles Lakers for a reported $600,000 and then attempted to build the team a new arena. Ultimately, Chamberlain was not allowed to be a player for San Diego, as the Lakers sued for violation of contract, leaving Chamberlain as Head Coach only. Then, on November 7, 1973, Bloom's 20,000 seat $200 million arena in Chula Vista narrowly failed in a special referendum. Chamberlain reportedly had refused to campaign for the arena project. "If I have to go there, they can't want it very much," he said.

After the arena referendum failed, the ABA directed Bloom to look at moving the team to Los Angeles. However, Bloom and Graham then reached agreement to move the team from Golden Hall. Following the 1973–74 season, the Qs finally moved to the San Diego Sports Arena. Chamberlain retired after his one season as the Qs’coach and did not move with the team. The team struggled and had low attendance at the new arena. Following the 1974–75 season, Bloom sold the team to Frank Goldberg. After changing their name to the San Diego Sails and starting the 1975–76 season with a 3–8 record, the franchise folded.

Other users
On election night Golden Hall serves as election headquarters. During the COVID-19 pandemic, the hall was converted into a homeless shelter.

References

Indoor arenas in California
Basketball venues in California
San Diego Sails
American Basketball Association venues
Defunct basketball venues in the United States
Sports venues in San Diego
San Diego Conquistadors
Buildings and structures completed in 1964
1964 establishments in California